Turkey competed at the 2015 World Aquatics Championships in Kazan, Russia from 24 July to 9 August 2015.

Swimming

Turkish swimmers have achieved qualifying standards in the following events (up to a maximum of 2 swimmers in each event at the A-standard entry time, and 1 at the B-standard):

Men

Women

Mixed

Synchronized swimming

Turkey has qualified four synchronized swimmers to compete in each of the following events.

Women

Mixed

References

External links
Türkiye Yüzme Federasyonu 

Nations at the 2015 World Aquatics Championships
2015 in Turkish sport
Turkey at the World Aquatics Championships